Anatoly Sergeyevich Kulikov (born September 4, 1946 in Aigursky, Stavropol Krai, Russian SFSR) is a Russian General of the Army, former Interior Minister of Russia (1995–1998).

In 1992 Kulikov became Commander of the Interior Troops. Hence he was one of the commanders of pro-government forces during the 1993 Constitutional Crisis in Moscow and the First Chechen War. In early 1995 Kulikov was appointed commander of the Joint Group of Federal Forces in Chechnya and he commanded the Russian forces during the infamous Samashki massacre.

On July 6, 1995, after the Budyonnovsk hostage crisis, he succeeded Viktor Yerin as Interior Minister of Russia. In August 1996 Alexander Lebed, who had just been appointed Secretary of the Security Council of Russia, blamed Kulikov for the disastrous Battle of Grozny and requested that President Boris Yeltsin sack him. However, Yeltsin declined his request and in October fired Lebed from his position.

In 1997, Kulikov linked both the Cherney brothers and Reuben brothers to the Izmaylovskaya mafia which was led by Anton Malevsky in Israel, but, in March 1998, Boris Yeltsin removed Kulikov from his post along with the entire second cabinet of Viktor Chernomyrdin.

While most of the ministers of the old cabinet were reappointed to Sergei Kiriyenko's Cabinet, Kulikov wasn't and Sergei Stepashin became the next interior minister. Afterwards, Kulikov was elected to the State Duma twice, in the 1999 election and 2003 election, and was a member of the pro-government United Russia faction.

Honours and awards
 Order of Merit for the Fatherland, 3rd class (3 September 1996) - for services to the state, his great personal contribution to strengthening the rule of law and many years of honest service in the internal affairs
 Order of Honour (16 April 2004) - for active participation in legislative activities and many years of honest work
 Order for Personal Courage
 Jubilee Medal "In Commemoration of the 100th Anniversary since the Birth of Vladimir Il'ich Lenin"
 Order for Service to the Homeland in the Armed Forces of the USSR 3rd class
 Medal "For Distinction in the Protection of Public Order"
 Jubilee Medal "Twenty Years of Victory in the Great Patriotic War 1941-1945"
 Jubilee Medal "Thirty Years of Victory in the Great Patriotic War 1941-1945"
 Jubilee Medal "300 Years of the Russian Navy"
 Medal "In Commemoration of the 850th Anniversary of Moscow"
 Medal "Veteran of the Armed Forces of the USSR"
 Jubilee Medal "50 Years of the Armed Forces of the USSR"
 Jubilee Medal "60 Years of the Armed Forces of the USSR"
 Jubilee Medal "70 Years of the Armed Forces of the USSR"
 Medal "For Impeccable Service" 1st, 2nd and 3rd classes
 Medal "Anatoly Koni" (Min Justice)
 Medal "For Services to the Stavropol Territory" (Stavropol Territory, September 2006)

References

External links
Timothy L. Thomas. Anatoliy Sergeevich Kulikov: Policeman, Power Minister, Deputy Prime Minister...Politician? Low Intensity Conflict & Law Enforcement Vol. 7, No. 1 (Summer 1998), pp. 149–178.
 Biography as of 1997 in Russian

1946 births
Deputy heads of government of the Russian Federation
Generals of the army (Russia)
Interior ministers of Russia
Living people
People from Apanasenkovsky District
People of the Chechen wars
Recipients of the Order "For Merit to the Fatherland", 3rd class
Recipients of the Order of Honour (Russia)
Recipients of the Order "For Personal Courage"
Frunze Military Academy alumni
Military Academy of the General Staff of the Armed Forces of the Soviet Union alumni
Third convocation members of the State Duma (Russian Federation)
Fourth convocation members of the State Duma (Russian Federation)